Paratoari (also known as the Pyramids of Paratoari, Pyramids of Pantiacolla or "The Dots") is a site composed of pyramid-shaped natural formations in the Manu area of dense tropical rainforest in southeast Peru. It was first identified via NASA satellite photograph number C-S11-32W071-03, released in 1976. They subsequently garnered greater attention among South America aficionados through a series of three articles which questioned from afar what "The Dots" might truly represent (and settled upon a geological explanation being the most plausible) in 1977 - 1979 issues of the "South American Explorer" journal, written under the name of "Ursula Thiermann" by Don Montague, president of the South American Explorers Club.

The next 20 years were filled with speculation as to the formations' true nature, as they appeared to be symmetrically spaced and uniform in shape, looking like a series of eight or more pyramids, in at least four rows of two. In August 1996 Boston-based explorer Gregory Deyermenjian of The Explorers Club, along with Peruvian partners Paulino Mamani, Dante Núñez del Prado, Fernando Neuenschwander, Ignacio Mamani, and Machiguenga "Roberto", his wife "Grenci" and their baby daughter "Reina", were first to make an on-site exploration. Their survey identified Paratoari as natural sandstone formations, not as symmetrical in placement or as uniform in size as suggested by their image on the satellite photograph, and without any sign of the influence of ancient culture.

The formations, which are at the edge of a higher area that breaks down into lower jungle, were argued to be a natural landform, which is known as truncated ridge spurs (as put forth 17 years previously in the last of the three "Ursula Thiermann" articles). However, according to pictures in these articles, these formations are another natural landform, which geomorphologists refer to as a "flatiron". Deyermenjian has since, in 1999 and 2006, seen and photographed various very similar sites in the area of the Río Timpía, with intriguingly pyramidal-shaped huge natural formations.

References
"Tips & Notes" section of South American Explorer, No. 54, Winter 1998, page 46, "Seeing Dots" (update concerning "the Dots" and Deyermenjian's follow-up to the SAE articles of the 1970s).
Gregory Deyermenjian, "The Search for the Lost Pyramids of Peru: My Dash to the Dots", World Explorer, Vol. 2 No. 3, 1998.
Ursula Thiermann, "Dots Dots Dots" South American Explorer, Vol. 1 No. 4, April 1979.
Ursula Thiermann, "Dots Update", South American Explorer, Vol. 1 No. 2, March 1978.
Ursula Thiermann, "The Dots of Pantiacolla", South American Explorer, Vol. 1 No. 1, October 1977.

Geography of Peru